Knockainey is a Gaelic Athletic Association club located in Knockainey, County Limerick, Ireland. The club, founded in 1936, fields teams in both hurling and Gaelic football. Knockainey's nickname is "All Blacks" which was inspired by New Zealand Rugby team. Knockainey wear black jersey's which were also inspired by The All Blacks

Overview

Honours
 Limerick Junior Hurling Championship (2):1953, 1991
 Limerick Intermediate Hurling Championship (1): 2001
 Limerick Minor A Hurling Championship (1): 2021

Notable players

 Tommy Cooke
 Patrick Reale
 Patrick Kirby
 Eugene Mulcahy

External sources
 Limerick Club Information

Gaelic games clubs in County Limerick
Hurling clubs in County Limerick
Gaelic football clubs in County Limerick